Bicyclus brakefieldi is a butterfly in the family Nymphalidae. It is found in the Democratic Republic of the Congo. The species is named after Paul Brakefield.

References

Elymniini
Insects described in 2012
Endemic fauna of the Democratic Republic of the Congo
Butterflies of Africa